A blister is a small pocket of fluid in the upper layer of the skin caused by heat, electricity, chemicals, light, radiation, or friction

Blister(s) or Blistering may also refer to:
 Anti-torpedo bulge, also known as an anti-torpedo blister
 Blister (TV series)
 Blister (band), a Norwegian band
 Blister (Portuguese band)
 Blister pack, a type of packaging
 Blistering (magazine), an online heavy metal and hard rock magazine
 "Blister", a song by Jimmy Eat World from the album Clarity
 "Blisters", a song by Neurosis from the album The Word as Law
 "Blisters", a song by War from the album Deliver the Word
 An asymmetrical spinnaker
 Another name for a mustard plaster